Michael Gibson (born 29 October 1980 in Blackburn, Lancashire) is a TV presenter and documentary director. He presented the MTV Select television program which aired weekday afternoons on MTV across Europe.

Career

Early career

After spending some time working as a runner at Talkback Thames, Gibson was hired by MTV to work as a presenter and began presenting MTV Select in the UK and Europe in 2006. He then went on to work as a researcher at Betty TV, working on Freaky Eaters. He worked as a freelance editor, working with big corporate clients like Belvedere Vodka and Nokia. He left London and started teaching media for a few years, then setting up a business renting out a video guestbook for special events in 2011. He now works at the BBC and just finished on series 12 of Dragons' Den.

Personal life

Gibson was diagnosed with Parkinson's disease at the age of 18. It is rare for someone to be diagnosed with Parkinson's at such a young age. Michael lived in denial about his condition for six years. He then pitched a documentary proposal to Channel 4, who commissioned him to make a documentary following Michael's journey with Parkinson's. All shook up: Parkinson's at 25 aired on Channel 4 in 2006.

Sources 
Thisislondon.co.uk
MTV.co.uk
BBC.co.uk
Channel4.com
Parkinsons.org
BBC.co.uk
MMU.ac.uk

1980 births
Living people
People from Blackburn
English television presenters